Roberto Santamaría may refer to:

 Roberto Santamaría (footballer, born 1962)
 Roberto Santamaría (footballer, born 1985)